Homer Community Consolidated School District 33C is a school district that serves the communities of Homer Glen, Illinois and Lockport, Illinois. Students in grades K-8 attend schools in Homer School District 33C.

Schools
Luther J. Schilling School- K-4
William J. Butler- 1-4
William E. Young- Early Childhood, 1-4
Goodings Grove School- 1-4
Hadley Middle School- 5-6
Homer Jr. High School- 7-8

High school
Students who attend schools in District 33-C go to Lockport Township High School in District 205.

External links
 District website

School districts in Will County, Illinois
Lockport, Illinois